Sanctifica was a Swedish unblack metal band, formed in 1996, and disbanded in 2003. After releasing their EP, In the Bleak Midwinter, in 1997, they were considered to be one of the leading modern Christian black metal bands in the early 2000s with their album Spirit of Purity. Signed to Swedish Rivel Records and Finnish Little Rose Productions, the band played progressive death metal on their second and last album Negative B. They did a tour through Scandinavia to support that album, performing at some of the best known rock clubs in big cities. Hubertus Liljegren went to join Crimson Moonlight, while the rest formed a rock group called As a Reminder.

History
In 1996 Hubertus Liljegren (guitars) and Daniel Thelin (drums) formed Sanctifica, and the band were joined by Alexander Orest (bass). Initially, the band played death metal, until Alexander left the bass guitar for Jonathan Jansson and began playing keyboards, taking the sound more towards black metal.

During late 1997, Sanctifica recorded a demo tape titled In the Bleak Midwinter, which presented Scandinavian black metal and was released in early 1998. Afterwards Henrik Georgsson joined the band as a second guitar player.

By 1999 Alexander was replaced by Aron Engberg. The band's sound changed from atmospheric black metal to chaotic black metal. Sanctifica went to Studio Berghen to records its first full-length, produced by engineer Mick Nordström.

The debut album, Spirit of Purity, was released in March 2000 through Little Rose Productions and Rivel Records (then known as C.L. Music & Publishing). Following the release, Sanctifica played concerts in Sweden, Norway and Finland.

By 2001 the band left black metal and evolved to a more experimental, progressive death metal act. Later that year, Sanctifica entered a studio to record Negative B, a concept album produced by the guitar virtuoso Carl Johan Grimmark. The band recorded the album in four months and released it in March 2002.

During the concerts following the album's release, Björn Isacsson played all guitar parts for a while, letting Hubertus perform vocals. In May, David Sieving of Crimson Moonlight joined as a vocalist, and Hubertus concentrated on playing guitar. Sanctifica played a number of concerts at different festivals in Scandinavia during the summer 2002. Some concerts included a performance by the dancer Lovisa Lindström.

In 2002, the band was part of a sampler for Tarantula Promotions, titled Arachnid Terror Sampler, which featured bands such as Soul Embraced, Tortured Conscience, Frosthardr and Frost Like Ashes.

In the beginning of October, Sanctifica played a tour in Finland, performing at rock clubs of Turku, Helsinki and Jyväskylä. Afterwards. Hubertus left the band.

Sanctifica disbanded in 2003. Hubertus Liljegren went to join Crimson Moonlight, while the rest formed a group called As a Reminder.

Style
Evolving from their death metal roots to black metal, their early music is characterized by technical, melodic tremolo riffs, mid-range shrieks or high-pitched growls, symphonic keyboards, cold, chaotic yet tight controlled soundscapes, obscurely mixed drum sounds and slow to fast-paced tempo arrangements. The style heard on Negative B contains unconventional song structures, experimental sound samples of clapping hands, cellphone ringtones and cable sounds to name a few, and technical and elaborate riffing. The vocals on that album were dominated by the clean voice while incorporating some death growls of Hubertus as well. Sanctifica did not adapt the visual side of black metal, preferring the more everyday look.

Reception
The first EP, In the Bleak Midwinter received positive reviews. Spirit of Purity was mostly well-received, gaining rave reviews and some calling it a "masterpiece." However, the band was also quickly dubbed as an "Emperor clone" because of the similarities in their sound. The album was criticized for too chaotic output, lacking memorability, and bad drum mixing. Negative B got mixed reviews for its bizarre entity: Several critics considered it to be unique, at parts even "brilliant," but some reviewers called the style unbalanced and unfocused, claiming that the songs on the second half of the album lacked a proper structure. However, it was praised for its technically proficient musicianship.

Discography
Demo
In the Bleak Midwinter (1998)

Splits
In the Bleak Midwinter / Songs of Solomon (2001; Split w/ Pantokrator)

Studio albums
Spirit of Purity (2000)
Negative B (2002)

Members
Last Known Lineup

Former members

References

External links
Sanctifica - Encyclopaedia Metallum: The Metal Archives

Musical groups established in 1996
Musical groups disestablished in 2003
Swedish black metal musical groups
Swedish Christian metal musical groups
Unblack metal musical groups